Eugeniusz Ptak (born 1 September 1960) is a retired Polish football striker.

References

1960 births
Living people
Polish footballers
Śląsk Wrocław players
Zagłębie Lubin players
Apollon Limassol FC players
Nea Salamis Famagusta FC players
VfB Oldenburg players
Miedź Legnica players
Association football forwards
Polish expatriate footballers
Expatriate footballers in Cyprus
Polish expatriate sportspeople in Cyprus
Expatriate footballers in Germany
Polish expatriate sportspeople in Germany